"Killing Me" is a song by South Korean singer Chungha. It was released as a special single on November 29, 2021, through MNH Entertainment, and Stone Music Entertainment.

Background
On November 19, 2021, Chungha announced that she will be releasing a special single titled on November 29, 2021. The teaser timetable was released on November 20, 2021. According to the timetable, photo teasers, an online cover image, and 2 music video teasers would be revealed on July 21–27.

Composition and lyrics
"Killing" was written by Chungha and Jo Yoon-kyung, and composed by Musikality, Celine Svanbäck, Jeppe London, Mich Hansen, and Sam Merrifield. It runs for two minutes and forty-three seconds. From the YouTube music video, the single is described as an uptempo, pop number piece and rhythmical vocal that describes a painful heartbreak. The chorus highlights Chungha's vocal colors and her writing abilities and she describes the repetition of everyday life and exhaustion. Like the bright light at the end of a tunnel, Chungha refocuses her message of hope in her lyrics for people.

Music video
The music video was released on November 29, 2021, and in the music video for the track, confronts the waves of grief in the aftermath of a heartbreak, that speaks to the collective hurt for the times.

Credits and personnel

 Chungha – vocals, lyrics
 Kim Yeon-seo – background vocals
 Jo Yoon-kyung – lyrics
 Musikality – composition, arrangement
 Celine Svanbäck – composition
 Jeppe London – composition, arrangement
 Mich Hansen – composition
 Sam Merrifield – composition
 Cutfather – arrangement
 Jeong Eun-kyung (Ingrid Studio) – recording
 Alwan (Alawn Music Studios) – mixing
 Kwon Nam-woo (821 Mastering Sound) – mastering

Charts

Release history

References

2021 songs
2021 singles
Chungha songs
MNH Entertainment singles
Korean-language songs